Metrobates is a genus of water striders in the family Gerridae. There are about 16 described species in Metrobates.

Species
These 16 species belong to the genus Metrobates:

 Metrobates alacris Drake, 1955
 Metrobates amblydonti Nieser, 1993-31
 Metrobates anomalus Hussey, 1948
 Metrobates artus Anderson, 1932
 Metrobates curracis Drake & Roze, 1954
 Metrobates denticornis (Champion, 1898)
 Metrobates fugientis Drake & Harris, 1945-01
 Metrobates hesperius Uhler, 1871
 Metrobates laetus Drake, 1954
 Metrobates laudatus Drake & Harris, 1937
 Metrobates plaumanni Hungerford, 1951-01
 Metrobates porcus Anderson, 1932
 Metrobates sanciprianensis Castro-Vargas, Morales & Molano-Rendón, 2018
 Metrobates trux (Torre-bueno, 1921)
 Metrobates tumidus Anderson, 1932
 Metrobates vigilis Drake, 1958-01

References

Further reading

 

Trepobatinae
Gerromorpha genera
Articles created by Qbugbot